Elections to Liverpool City Council were held on Saturday 1 November 1902.

A total of 38 seats were up for election. Seven new seats were up for election for the first time: the third seat for the Anfield ward, and all three seats for each of the new wards of Aigburth and Garston.

20 of the 38 seats were not contested.

After the election, the composition of the council was:

Election result

In view of the large number of uncontested seats, these statistics should be taken in that context.

Ward results

* - Retiring Councillor seeking re-election

Comparisons are made with the 1899 election results, as the retiring councillors were elected in that year.

Abercromby

Aigburth

Anfield

Breckfield

Brunswick

Castle Street

Dingle

Edge Hill

Everton

Exchange

Fairfield

Garston

As Edward Wrake Turner received the highest number of seats his term of office was due to expire on 1 November 1905.
As Frederick James Rawlinson received the second highest number of seats his term of office was due to expire on 1 November 1904.
As James Picthall received the third highest number of seats his term of office was due to expire on 1 November 1903.

Granby

Great George

Kensington

Kirkdale

Low Hill

Netherfield

North Scotland

Prince's Park

Sandhills

St. Anne's

St. Domingo

St. Peter's

Sefton Park East

Sefton Park West

South Scotland

Vauxhall

Walton

Warbreck

Wavertree

West Derby

Aldermanic Election

It was reported to the council on 9 November 1902 that Garston Urban District Council had nominated John Ernest Tinne (Aigburth ward) and William Newall (Garston ward) to be  aldermen. These two were duly elected as aldermen by the councillors and aldermen on 9 November 1902.

By-elections

No.13, North Scotland, 17 December 1902 

Caused by the death of Councillor James Daly (Irish Nationalist, North Scotland, elected 1 November 1900) on 18 November 1902 was reported to the Council on 29 November 1902.

No. 12, Edge Hill, 30 January 1903

Caused by the death of Councillor Samuel Wasse Higginbottom MP (Conservative, elected 1 November 1902) on 28 December 1902.

No. 29 Aigburth, 30 April 1903

Caused by the resignation of Alderman John Ernest Tinne (elected 9 November 1902), which was reported to the council on 4 March 1893.

Councillor William Hall Jowett (Conservative, Aigburth, elected 1 November 1902) was elected as an alderman by the council (councillors and aldermen) on 1 April 1903
.

No.16, Exchange, 15 June 1903

The death of Alderman James Ruddin occurred on 21 April 1903 was reported to the Council on 6 May 1903. His place was taken by Councillor Edmond Brownbill (Liberal. Exchange, elected 1 November 1902) was elected as an alderman by the council (Councillors and Aldermen) on 3 June 1903.

No.3 Anfield, 26 May 1903

The death of Councillor John Valentine Smith (Conservative, Anfield elected 10 May 1901) on 1 May 1903 was reported to the council on 6 May 1903

No.26, Dingle, 15 June 1903

Caused by the resignation of Councillor Austin Taylor MP (Conservative, Dingle, elected 1 November 1902)

No.30, Garston, 27 July 1903

The death of Alderman William Newall on 5 June 1903 was reported to the Council on 10 June 1903.

In his place, Councillor Edward Wrake Turner (Independent Conservative, Garston, elected 1 November 1902) was elected as an alderman by the council (councillors and aldermen) on 1 July 1903.

.

No. Sandhills, 6 August 1903

The death of Councillor Thomas Salter (Liberal, Sandhills, elected 1 November 1901) on 5 July 1903 was reported to the council on 5 August 1903.

No.21, Abercromby, 

Caused by the death of Councillor Lorents Braun Haddock (Conservative, Abercromby, elected 1 November 1900) on 21 August 1903, which was reported to the Council on 2 September 1903.

See also

 Liverpool City Council
 Liverpool Town Council elections 1835 - 1879
 Liverpool City Council elections 1880–present
 Mayors and Lord Mayors of Liverpool 1207 to present
 History of local government in England

References

1902
Liverpool
1900s in Liverpool
November 1902 events